Nineveh Township is an inactive township in Lincoln County, in the U.S. state of Missouri.

Nineveh Township was established in 1872.

References

Townships in Missouri
Townships in Lincoln County, Missouri